Oestophora is a genus of air-breathing land snail, a terrestrial gastropod mollusk in the family Trissexodontidae.

Distribution 
The distribution of the genus Oestophora includes western Iberian peninsula, north Africa and the Azores.

Description 
The shell is ribbed, with rounded or keeled whorls. The apertural margin is reflected and thickened.

Reproductive system: There is no flagellum, no penial papilla. There is one small dart sac, one longer accessory sac separated from vaginal walls and vagina with 3 simple and long accessory (mucus) glands.

The number of haploid chromosomes is 30.

Species 
Species within the genus Oestophoa include:
 Oestophora barbula (Rossmässler, 1838)
Oestophora barrelsi (Hovestadt & Ripken, 2015)
 Oestophora calpeana (Morelet, 1854)
 Oestophora dorotheae Hesse, 1930
 Oestophora granesae Arrébola Burgos, 1998
 Oestophora lusitanica (Pfeiffer, 1841) - type species
 Oestophora ortizi Winter & Ripken, 1991
 Oestophora silvae Ortiz de Zárate López, 1962
 Oestophora tarnieri (Morelet, 1854)

Synonyms:
 Oestophora turriplana  is a synonym for Gittenbergeria turriplana (Morelet, 1845)

References 
This article incorporates public domain text from the reference 

Trissexodontidae
Gastropods described in 1907
Taxonomy articles created by Polbot